Camillo Guarino Guarini (17 January 1624 – 6 March 1683) was an Italian architect of the Piedmontese Baroque, active in Turin as well as Sicily, France, and Portugal. He was a Theatine priest, mathematician, and writer.

Biography
Guarini was born in Modena in 1624. Following the chosen path of his eldest brother Eugenio, Guarino entered the Theatine Order as a novitiate on the twenty-seventh of November, 1639 at the age of fifteen. He spent his novitiate at the monastery of San Silvestro al Quirinale in Rome, where he studied architecture, theology, philosophy and mathematics. During Guarini's Roman years, Francesco Borromini and Gian Lorenzo Bernini created the buildings and sculpture which defined the Roman Baroque style. From Borromini, Guarini learned the use of complex geometry as a basis for floor plans. Borromini's second Roman church, Sant'Ivo alla Sapienza, was a star hexagon plan created by superimposing two equilateral triangles. Guarini used such a format in the presbytery dome of San Lorenzo in Turin.

Upon completion of seminary in 1647, Guarini returned to Modena where he was ordained in 1648. He worked with Giovanni Castiglione on the Church of San Vincenzo and the Theatine monastery. Guarini rose quickly in the Theatine hierarchy, becoming first auditor, then superintendent of works, treasurer, lecturer in philosophy, procuratore, and finally provost in 1654. Prince Alfonso supported another candidate and Guarini was soon replaced and had to leave Modena. The next few years are poorly documented. He became a member of the Theatine House of Parma in 1656 and apparently visited Prague and Lisbon. Between 1657 and 1659 he stayed in Spain, where he studied Moorish architecture; this influenced the style of some of his buildings in Turin.

In 1660, Guarini was appointed to a professorial position at the archiepiscopal seminary in Messina. During his tenure at the seminary, Guarini taught mathematics and philosophy and was commissioned with several architectural projects which he pursued over the next two years, including the design of the façade of Santa Maria Annunziata, as well as the adjacent Convento di San Vincenzo, the Church of San Filippo and a church for the Somaschi Fathers, a religious order founded in devotional service of the poor by Gerolamo Emiliani (1486–1537) in 1532. Guarini published his first literary work during his time in Messina, an elaborate political and poetic drama entitled﻿ La Pietà Trionfante. Guarini developed La Pietà into a play that was performed by the students of the seminary. The story resembles the character play and moral allegory present﻿ in Greek myths.

In 1662, Guarini received word that his mother was gravely ill and swiftly departed from Sicily to Modena to stay with her at the end of her life. He remained there for several months while also drafting plans for the façade of the Theatine church of San Vincenzo in Modena, but the project was never executed.

Guarini was reassigned to Paris in October 1662, where he took up the building of the Church of Sainte-Anne-la-Royale, originally commissioned to Antonio Maurizio Valperga (1605–1688). He thought poorly of Valperga's design–that it would be dark, narrow and lacking in unity–and presented a new design for Sainte-Anne-la-Royale in the shape of a Greek cross. He widened the four arms of the cross, creating an elegant symmetry of space in harmony with the large central dome. During the construction of Sainte-Anne-la-Royale, Guarini was appointed as a lecturer of theology at the Theatine School in Paris. His travel in France gave him the opportunity for contact with not only many Gothic cathedrals but also with the work of Desargue on projective geometry. "It was this new geometry that supplied the scientific basis for Guarini's daring structures, particularly of domes."

The construction of Sainte Anne began on the twenty-eighth of November, 1662 in a prominent site facing the Louvre on the quai of the Seine. Four years into the construction, both transepts of the church were nearing completion. Financial strains, as well as monetary and material resources became increasingly irregular, putting the project in jeopardy. In a fit of resignation, Guarini sharply accused the superior of the Theatine Order of mishandling resources and abandoned the project, leaving swiftly for Turin in the autumn of 1666.

In May 1668, Charles Emmanuel II, Duke of Savoy named him Royal Engineer and Mathematician. He designed a large number of public and private buildings in Turin, including the palaces of Charles Emmanuel II (as well as his sister Louise Christine of Savoy), the Royal Church of San Lorenzo (1666–1680), most of the Chapel of the Holy Shroud (housing the Shroud of Turin; begun in 1668 by Amedeo di Castellamonte), the Palazzo Carignano (1679–85), the Castle of Racconigi and many other public and ecclesiastical buildings at Modena, Messina, Verona, Vienna, Prague, Lisbon, and Paris. The Palazzo Carignano is regarded as one of the finest urban palaces of the second half of the 17th century in Italy. Guarini appears to have been influenced by Borromini.

Guarini died in Milan in 1683. In architecture, his successors include Filippo Juvarra, and Juvarra's pupil Bernardo Vittone.

Mathematical and philosophical works 
Guarini wrote ten treatises on a multitude of subjects, including architecture, mathematics and astronomy. In 1665, he published Placita Philosophica (A System of Philosophy), a large mathematical-philosophical treatise divided into seven books. Guarini published this work while he was a professor of theology in Paris. It is a comprehensive, pragmatic system, spanning the fields of logic, anatomy, biology, astronomy, physics, theology and metaphysics. Guarino's Placita belongs to the school of thought usually referred to as Baroque Scholasticism. It also shares strong similarities to Nicolas Malebranche's Occasionalism. The content of the Placita indicates that Guarini attentively followed scientific developments of the era. In some cases he endorsed them - for instance, Galileo’s discovery that celestial objects are material and corruptible. Although, following the views of Aristotle, Guarino denies the existence of a vacuum, he describes and discusses Torricelli's barometer and barometric experiment with a glass tube closed at the top and filled with mercury. Guarini's Placita includes an extensive section on theoretical astronomy. He defends the Ptolemaic system dismissing both the Copernican and Tycho Brahe’s systems. He displays a good knowledge of modern scholarship and quotes frequently from Johannes Kepler’s and Galileo's work. The French astronomer and Catholic priest Ismaël Bullialdus is also mentioned numerous times in conjunction with Kepler, particularly when discussing the eccentricity of planetary orbits. Guarino gives a lengthy description of the motion of planets and the sun according to the geocentric model. He determines fairly accurately the distance between the moon and the Earth and concludes that Galileo's observation of the change in lunar distance is due to a change in velocity; that when the moon appears closer to the earth, it moves faster. Guarini attempts to discover the reason for this, using Euclidean geometry, triangulation and quadratura (quadrature), the available methods at a time that still predate the development of calculus and Newton's law of universal gravitation. Prior to the publication of Newton's Principia, Guarini theorizes that the velocity of light is a constant and the movement of light is a perturbance or wave. Guarini also theorizes that light travels from the sun to the earth in a vacuum (coniuncta soli est: unde vacua luce) until it reaches the atmosphere creating heat, wind and the movement of the ocean.

His main work, entitled Euclides adauctus et methodicus (1671), is a treatise on descriptive geometry in thirty-five books. The first three books reintroduce arguments of philosophical nature already addressed in the Placita Philosophica regarding in particular the existence of indivisibles. Guarini comments on the works of Bonaventura Cavalieri, praising his method of indivisibles. He cites both the objections to this method used by Mario Bettinus in the Epilogus Planimetricus and that of Paul Guldin in De centro gravitatis solidorum, as well as the authors who appreciated the mathematical proofs, such as Ismaël Bullialdus in De lineis spiralibus and Vincenzo Viviani in De maximis et minimis. Guarini's conclusion is articulated in nine points and ends with the judgment that Cavalieri did not provide an actual and evident proof because in his method he goes from one species to another: the indivisible segments (of the first species) form a surface (of the second species) and this kind of proportion between figures of different species is not permitted in geometry. In books IV-XII Guarini presents and proves the propositions set forth by Euclid in books I-VII and X of the Elements. Books XXII and XXXIII are devoted to solid geometry, the intersection of planes and the inscription of the five regular polyhedra in the sphere, a theme addressed by Euclid in his books XI, XII and XIII. In the final two books of the Euclides adauctus and in the Appendix, added to the work shortly after 1671, Guarini deals with the volumes of bodies contained by plane surfaces, such as pyramids and prisms, and by curved sufaces.

Guarini's strong mathematical background is evident in his architectural work. As he states in his Euclides adauctus et methodicus: «Thaumaturga Mathematicorum miraculorum insigni, vereque Regali architectura coruscat» - 'The magic of wondrous mathematicians shines brightly in the marvelous and truly regal architecture'.

In addition to his writings on mathematics, he published a treatise entitled Il modo di misurare le fabbriche (1674) and a book on military engineering, the Trattato di fortificatione che hora si usa in Fiandra, Francia, et Italia (1676). After his death the Theatines published the Disegni d’architettura civile et ecclesiastica, an engraved collection of his projects (1686). The complete treatise, his major work, the Architettura civile, was published in 1737 by Bernardo Vittone. This book was widely circulated in eighteenth century Austria and Germany, contributing to the development of such architects as Johann Lukas von Hildebrandt, Johann Bernhard Fischer von Erlach, and Balthasar Neumann.

Publications

 
 
 
 
 
 Trattato di fortificazione, ibid., 1676, in-4°.
 
 
 
 Architettura civile divisa in cinque trattati, opera postuma, 2 vols., Turin, 1737.

Architectural works
 Church of the Somaschi Fathers (Messina, unbuilt project)
 Facade of Santissima Annunziata and adjacent Theatine palace (Messina, destroyed in 1908 earthquake)
 Sainte-Anne-la-Royale (1662, destroyed in 1823)
 Santa Maria della Divina Providenca (Lisbon, destroyed by the 1755 earthquake)
 San Filippo Neri (completed by Juvarra)
 Colegio dei Nobili (1678, Turin)
 Chapel of the Holy Shroud (1668–94, Turin)
 Royal Church of San Lorenzo (1668–87, Turin)
 Castle of Racconigi (1676–84, Racconigi)
 Palazzo Carignano (1679–85, Turin)
 Santuario della Consolata (restored later by others)

References in modern culture
Guarino Guarini is the subject of a composition, Guarini, the Master, written in 2004 by Italian composer Lorenzo Ferrero.

References

Further reading

External links

 
 

1624 births
1683 deaths
17th-century Italian architects
Italian architecture writers
Italian male writers
17th-century Italian mathematicians
Architects from Modena
Theatines